Leontien Martha Henrica Petronella Zijlaard-van Moorsel (born 22 March 1970) is a Dutch retired racing cyclist. She was a dominant cyclist in the 1990s and early 2000s, winning four gold medals at the Olympic Games and holding the hour record for women from 2003 until 2015.

Career

Van Moorsel started her career in 1977. She won major races both on the track, and on the road. In the first half of the 1990s, she won the Tour Féminin twice, after fierce competition with Jeannie Longo.

Van Moorsel dropped out of cycling in 1994 with anorexia nervosa but recovered to compete at the World Championships in 1998, winning the time trial and coming second in the road race.

At the 2000 Summer Olympics in Sydney, van Moorsel won gold medals on the road (road race and time trial), and on the track (3 km pursuit). At the 2004 Summer Olympics, she fell in the penultimate lap of the road race and was stretchered off and taken to the hospital by ambulance, but nevertheless successfully defended her time trial title two days later.

Her four gold medals tie her with Ireen Wüst, Inge de Bruijn, Charles Pahud de Mortanges and Fanny Blankers-Koen for the most ever by a Dutch athlete at the Olympics.

She set a new world hour record for women of 46.065 km, in 2003 in Mexico City, which was not improved upon for almost 12 years, when UCI rule changes prompted a new succession of attempts.

Van Moorsel retired from professional cycling after the 2004 Olympics.

In 2017 Van Moorsel became director of the Women's Amstel Gold Race.

In September 2017, Van Moorsel was accused by sports physician Peter Janssen of using EPO in 2000 and 2001.

Major results 

1985 
1st  National Novice Road Race Championships

1987 
1st  National Novice Road Race Championships

1988 
1st  National Road Race Championships

1989 
1st  National Road Race Championships
1st Stage 1 Tour of Norway

1990 
1st  UCI Track Cycling World Championships (Individual Pursuit)
1st UCI Road World Championships Team Time Trial
1st  National Road Race Championships
2nd Overall Tour de l'Aude Cycliste Féminin
National Track Championship
3rd Points race
3rd Individual sprint
3rd Chrono des Nations

1991 
1st  UCI Road World Championships Road Race
1st  National Track Championships (Team pursuit)
1st  Overall Tour de l'Aude Cycliste Féminin
3rd National Road Race Championships

1992 
1st  National Road Race Championships
National Track Championship
1st  Individual pursuit
2nd Points race
1st  Overall Grande Boucle Féminine Internationale

1993 
1st  UCI Road World Championships Road Race
1st  Overall Grande Boucle Féminine Internationale
1st  National Road Race Championships
2nd Overall Tour de l'Aude Cycliste Féminin

1997
1st  National Time Trial Championships
National Track Championships
1st  Individual pursuit
2nd Points race
1st Overall Boekel
1st Stages 1 & 3

1998
1st  UCI Road World Championships Time Trial
National Road Championships
1st  Road Race
1st  Time Trial
National Track Championships
1st  Individual pursuit
1st  Points race
1st  Overall Ster van Zeeland
1st Stages 1 & 3
1st Parel van de Veluwe
1st Omloop der Kempen
2nd Overall Boels Rental Ladies Tour
1st Stage 1 
2nd UCI Road World Championships Road Race
2nd UCI Track Cycling World Championships (Individual Pursuit)

1999
1st  UCI Road World Championships Time Trial
National Road Championships
1st  Road Race
1st  Time Trial
National Track Championships
1st  Individual pursuit
1st  Points race
1st  Overall Boels Rental Ladies Tour
1st Stages 2 & 7
1st  Overall Ster van Zeeland
1st Stages 2 & 3
1st Overall Greenery International
1st Stages 1, 2 & 3
1st Overall Boekel
1st Prologue, Stages 1 & 2 
1st Damesronde van Drenthe
1st Omloop van Kanaleneiland
1st Omloop der Kempen
2nd Rotterdam Tour

2000
Olympic Games
1st  Road Race
1st  Time Trial
1st  Individual pursuit
2nd  Points race
National Road Championships
1st  Time Trial
2nd Road Race
National Track Championships
1st  Individual pursuit
1st  Points race
1st  Overall Emakumeen Bira
1st  Overall Trophée d'Or Féminin
1st  Overall Ster van Zeeland
1st Stages 1 & 2
1st Overall Westfriese Dorpenomloop
1st Prologue & Stage 1
1st Overall Boekel
1st Stages 1, 2a & 2b
1st Ronde van het Ronostrand
1st Omloop der Kempen
1st Stages 1, 2 & 4 Giro d'Italia Femminile

2001
1st  UCI Track Cycling World Championships (Individual Pursuit)
1st  National Time Trial Championships
National Track Championships
1st  Individual pursuit
1st  Points race
1st Overall Ster van Zeeland
1st Stages 2 & 3
1st Overall Boekel
1st Stages 2 & 3 
1st Acht van Chaam
1st Egmond-Pier-Egmond
1st Souvenir Magali Pache
1st Profronde van Stiphout
1st Profronde van Surhuisterveen
1st Prologue Giro d'Italia Femminile
1st Stage 1 Boels Rental Ladies Tour
3rd Amstel Gold Race

2002
1st  UCI Track Cycling World Championships (Individual Pursuit)
National Road Championships
1st  Time Trial
2nd Road Race
National Track Championships
1st  Individual pursuit
1st  Points race
1st Overall RaboSter Zeeuwsche Eilanden
1st Stages 1, 2 & 3a
1st Overall Westfriese Dorpenomloop
1st Stages 1 & 2 
1st Amstel Gold Race
1st Damesronde van Drenthe
1st Acht van Chaam
1st Egmond-Pier-Egmond
1st Profronde van Stiphout,

2003
1st  UCI Track Cycling World Championships (Individual Pursuit)
1st Overall Boekel
1st Stage 3 
1st Omloop van Borsele
2nd National Time Trial Championships
World Hour record

2004
Olympic Games
1st  Time Trial
3rd  Individual pursuit
1st  National Road Race Championships
1st Ronde van Gelderland
1st Omloop der Kempen
1st Profronde van Stiphout
1st Acht van Chaam

Personal life
Van Moorsel married former track cyclist Michael Zijlaard in October 1995. They have a daughter.

See also

 List of Dutch Olympic cyclists
List of multiple Olympic gold medalists at a single Games

References

External links

  
 
 
 
 
 

 
 
 
 

1970 births
Cyclists at the 1992 Summer Olympics
Cyclists at the 2000 Summer Olympics
Cyclists at the 2004 Summer Olympics
Dutch cycling time trial champions
Dutch female cyclists
Living people
Medalists at the 2000 Summer Olympics
Medalists at the 2004 Summer Olympics
Olympic bronze medalists for the Netherlands
Olympic cyclists of the Netherlands
Olympic gold medalists for the Netherlands
Olympic medalists in cycling
Olympic silver medalists for the Netherlands
People from Boekel
Cyclists from North Brabant
UCI Road World Champions (women)
UCI Road World Championships cyclists for the Netherlands
UCI Track Cycling World Champions (women)
Dutch track cyclists
20th-century Dutch women
21st-century Dutch women